Chilabothrus ampelophis is a species of snake in the family Boidae. The species is endemic to the Dominican Republic.

References 

Chilabothrus
Reptiles of the Dominican Republic
Reptiles described in 2021